N'Zi Region is one of the 31 regions of Ivory Coast. Since its establishment in 2011, it has been one of the regions in Lacs District. The seat of the region is Dimbokro and the region's population in the 2021 census was 254,623. N'Zi is the only region is the country that does not border another district—it is entirely surrounded by other regions of Lacs District.

N'Zi Region is currently divided into three departments: Bocanda, Dimbokro, and Kouassi-Kouassikro.

History

In 2012, N'Zi Region was divided to create Moronou Region. Arrah, Bongouanou, and M'Batto Departments were removed from N'Zi and became the departments of Moronou.

Notes

 
Regions of Lacs District
States and territories established in 2011
2011 establishments in Ivory Coast